Alumni Gym may refer to:

Alumni Gym (Loyola University Chicago) in Chicago, Illinois
Alumni Gym (Elon University) in Elon, North Carolina
Alumni Gymnasium (Dartmouth College) in Hanover, New Hampshire
Alumni Gymnasium (Davidson College) in Davidson, North Carolina
Alumni Gymnasium (Drake University) in Des Moines, Iowa
Alumni Gymnasium (Rider University) in Lawrenceville, New Jersey
Alumni Gymnasium (University of Kentucky) in Lexington, Kentucky, now officially known as Alumni Gym Fitness Center
Alumni Gymnasium (WPI) in Worcester, Massachusetts